Prince Ata (Viliami 'Unaki-'o-'Tonga Lalaka moe 'Eiki Tuku'aho; born 27 April 1988 in Nukuʻalofa) is a Tongan royal and Prince of Tonga, younger son of Tupou VI, King of Tonga.

Biography 
Ata is the son of Tupou VI, King of Tonga, and Queen Nanasipauʻu Tukuʻaho. He has a brother Crown Prince Tupoutoʻa ʻUlukalala and a sister Princess Lātūfuipeka Tukuʻaho. He belongs to the line of succession to the Tongan throne and he is not married. He was appointed to the title of Ata in September 2006.

He was educated at Canberra Grammar, Canberra, A.C.T., Australia.

In 2014 King Tupou VI sent Prime Minister Sialeʻataongo Tuʻivakanō and a group of soldiers to a church in Haveluloto to prevent him from being baptized as a member of the Church of Jesus Christ of Latter-day Saints. In 2015, he became a member of the Church of Jesus Christ of Latter-day Saints in a ceremony in Hawaii without his father's knowledge.

Title, styles and honours

Title 
27 April 1988 – present: His Royal Highness Prince Ata of Tonga

Honours 
National Honours
 : Knight Grand Cross with Collar of the Royal Order of Pouono
 : Knight Grand Cross with Collar of the Order of Queen Salote Tupou III
 : Knight Grand Cross of the Order of the Crown of Tonga
 : Recipient of the King Tupou VI Coronation Medal
 : Recipient of the King George Tupou V Coronation Medal

References 

1988 births
Living people
Tongan royalty
Princes
Tongan Latter Day Saints
Converts to Mormonism from Methodism
Former Methodists
People from Nukuʻalofa
People educated at Canberra Grammar School
Sons of kings